Louise Friberg (born 24 June 1980) is a Swedish professional golfer who played on the Ladies European Tour (LET) and the United States-based LPGA Tour.

Early years
Born in a golfing family, Friberg started playing golf at young age at Rya Golf Club, outside Helsingborg, Sweden. Her father Mikael and her grandfather Björn were both elite golfers and each of them held a scratch handicap at the same time in the 1970s. Her grandfather Björn started the Swedish agency for Ping golf equipment, after he coincidentally met Karsten Solheim, when Björn tried to qualify for The Open Championship in England in 1971. Mikael continued to run the business until he retired after 45 years in 2016.

Consequently, Friberg kept playing with Ping clubs through her entire career.

Amateur career
Friberg was the 1997 Nordic Youth champion after finishing one-under par over 54 holes at Kalmar Golf Club, Sweden, beating future major winner Suzann Pettersen, Norway, by five strokes.

In 2002, she finished 9th and best Swedish player at the individual European Ladies Amateur Championship, played at Kristianstad Golf Club, Sweden, nine strokes behind winner Becky Brewerton, Wales.

She attended college at the University of Washington in the United States on a full golf scholarship where she was a standout golfer all four years and graduated with a Bachelor of Arts degree in Environmental Studies in 2003.

Professional career
Friberg turned professional at the end of 2003, playing first on the LPGA Futures Tour, then the Swedish Golf Tour, at the time named the Telia Tour, where she won the CA Ladies Trophy at Ullna Golf Club in September 2005. She qualified for the Ladies European Tour for 2006. In 2007, she recorded three top-10 finishes on the Ladies European Tour.

She competed at the 2007 Women's British Open, a major tournament on the LPGA Tour, at the Old Course at St Andrews, Scotland, and finished tied for 33rd. It was the first time a women's tournament were allowed at the Old Course.

At the fall 2007 LPGA Qualifying Tournament, she finished tied for 9th, earning fully exempt status on the LPGA Tour for the 2008 season.

In her third start as a tour member, Friberg earned her first LPGA Tour win at the 2008 MasterCard Classic at the Bosque Real Country Club in Mexico City, Mexico, beating runner-up Yani Tseng by one stroke and world number one Lorena Ochoa in 5th place in her home country. In the final round Friberg, shot a 7-under-par 65 to come from ten shots back, despite having been ill through the tournament week. Her MasterCard Classic win is tied for the largest final round comeback in LPGA Tour history. It was also the 100th victory by a Swedish born player on the LPGA Tour, since Liselotte Neumann won the first at the 1988 U.S. Women's Open.

On 15 September 2011, Friberg announced she would be retiring from tournament play after competing in the Navistar LPGA Classic, to start a career as a club professional at Vallda Golf & Country Club in Kungsbacka, Sweden. She did play the Kraft Nabisco Championship, from which she was exempt due to her 2008 win, in 2012 and 2013.

After being out of the game for two years running a junior golf program in Sweden and giving private lessons in Arizona, Friberg attempted a comeback and competed in the LPGA Tour's Qualifying School. In 2014 she played 10 tournaments on the LPGA Tour with a best finish of tied 24th at the Manulife Financial LPGA Classic in Waterloo, Ontario, Canada, after a score of 64 in her last round. She also made a visit to her old hometown in Sweden and played the 2014 Helsingborg Open on the Ladies European Tour and finished tied 14th.

During 2015, Friberg only competed in Europe, mainly in Sweden, and won once on the Swedish mini-tour Future Series. After the 2015 season she retired, for the second time, from regular tournament golf and was employed by her old club Rya Golf Club.

Private life
During her LPGA Tour career, she lived in Scottsdale, Arizona, United States. After moving back to Sweden, she settled in Rydebäck, south of Helsingborg. In December 2016, she was appointed sports manager at Rya Golf Club.

Amateur wins
1997 Nordic Youth Championship

Professional wins (3)

LPGA Tour wins (1)

Other wins (2)
2005 CA Ladies Trophy (Swedish Golf Tour)
2016 Abbekås Open (Swedish Mini Tour Future Series)

Results in LPGA majors
Results not in chronological order before 2014.

^ The Evian Championship was added as a major in 2013.

CUT = missed the half-way cut
T = tied

LPGA Tour career summary

Official as of 2012 season.

References

External links

University of Washington Player Profile

Swedish female golfers
Ladies European Tour golfers
LPGA Tour golfers
Washington Huskies women's golfers
Sportspeople from Helsingborg
Golfers from Scottsdale, Arizona
1980 births
Living people